With Our Own Eyes is a studio album by American jazz pianist Mulgrew Miller with bassist Richie Goods and drummer Tony Reedus. The album was released in December 1993 by Novus Records. This is Miller's second record for Novus and tenth overall.

Reception
Scott Yanow of Allmusic wrote "The consistent pianist Mulgrew Miller leads his trio ... through a set dominated by his originals but also including "Body and Soul" and Michel Legrand's "Summer Me, Winter Me." The McCoy Tyner influence will probably always remain a significant part of Miller's style but he is such a powerful player in his own right that one really does not mind. His originals on this set range from the modal 6/4 piece "Somewhere Else" and the thoughtful "Dreamin'" to the melancholy "Carousel." As with all of Mulgrew Miller's releases thus far, this one is well worth picking up". Reviewers of Billboard noted that "One of the unsung heroes of jazz piano, Miller is once again tasteful, poignant and on-target with a trio."

Track listing

Personnel
Band
Mulgrew Miller – piano
Richie Goods – bass
Tony Reedus – drums

Production
Michael Marciano – assistant engineer
Daniel Miller – photography
Jacqueline Murphy – art direction
James Nichols – editing, engineer, mastering
Tim Patterson – direction, director, producer
Ed Reed – assistant engineer
Sean Smith – design

References

1993 albums
Novus Records albums
Mulgrew Miller albums